Deferral or deferment may refer to:

 Deferral, in accounting
 Deferment – postponement of military conscription in the United States, particularly student deferments
 Student loan deferment – postponement of payment of a student loan
University admissions
 Deferred – when a student is rejected from the first round (early decision/early action) of admissions, but will be considered for the main round (regular decision)
 Deferred admission – when a student is accepted in one year (say 1990), but wishes to not enroll in this year, but rather in a future year, often next year (say 1991) – see gap year

Law
 Deferred disposition
 Deferred prosecution

Philosophy
 Différance